The 2019 Lebanese Challenge Cup was the 7th edition of the Lebanese Challenge Cup. The competition included the teams placed between 7th and 10th in the 2018–19 Lebanese Premier League, and the two newly promoted teams from the 2018–19 Lebanese Second Division. The first matchday was played on 19 July, one day prior to the start of the 2019 Lebanese Elite Cup. Tadamon Sour are the defending champions, having won the 2018 final. The final was held on 24 August, with Bourj beating Salam Zgharta 2–0 to be crowned champions.

Group stage

Group A

Group B

Final stage

Semi-finals

Final

Top scorers

References

External links
 RSSSF

Lebanese Challenge Cup seasons
Challenge